The 2015–16 Pittsburgh Panthers men's basketball team represented the University of Pittsburgh during the 2015–16 NCAA Division I men's basketball season. The team played its home games at the Petersen Events Center in Pittsburgh, Pennsylvania. The Panthers were led by thirteenth-year head coach Jamie Dixon. They were members of the Atlantic Coast Conference. They finished the season 21–12, 9–9 in ACC play to finish in a tie for ninth place. They defeated Syracuse in the second round of the ACC tournament to advance to the quarterfinals where they lost to North Carolina. They received an at-large bid to the NCAA tournament where, as a #10 seed, they lost in the first round to Wisconsin.

On March 21, 2016, head coach Jamie Dixon resigned to become the head coach at TCU. He finished at Pittsburgh with a 13-year record of 328–123 and went to the postseason in every season.

Last season
The Panthers finished the 2014–15 season 19–15, 8–10 in ACC play to finish in a three-way tie for ninth place. They lost in the second round of the ACC tournament to NC State. They were invited to the National Invitation Tournament where they lost in the first round to George Washington.

Departures

Incoming Transfers

Class of 2015 signees

Class of 2016 signees

Roster

}
}

Schedule

|-
!colspan=12 style="background:#091C44; color:#CEC499;" | Exhibition

|-
!colspan=12 style="background:#091C44; color:#CEC499;" | Regular season

|-
!colspan=9 style="background:#091C44; color:#CEC499;"| ACC Tournament

|-
!colspan=9 style="background:#091C44; color:#CEC499;"| NCAA tournament

Footnotes

References

Pittsburgh Panthers men's basketball seasons
Pittsburgh
Pittsburgh
Pittsburgh Pan
Pittsburgh Pan